Sildar is a small village located in Sirohi district, in the state of Rajasthan in Western India.

Villages in Sirohi district